On 18 April 2002, at 17:48 (local time), a Rockwell Commander 112 crashed into the upper floors of the Pirelli Tower in Milan, Italy, for reasons still unclear. The crash killed the pilot and two others in the building. Sixty more people sustained injuries in the building and on the ground.

The crash raised fears of a terrorist attack because of the similarities with the September 11 attacks, which had occurred seven months earlier. A subsequent investigation ruled out terrorism as a motive.

Incident
 
The airplane, piloted by 65-year-old Luigi Fasulo, took off from Locarno Airport in Magadino, Switzerland, eighteen minutes before the crash. Later as the airplane flew over Milan, Italy, the pilot radioed to the control tower at Linate Airport that there was a problem with the retractable landing gear. The tower began arranging an emergency landing.  The vibration of the impact caused shop windows to break and littered the surroundings with debris and glass in offices. The pilot and two others present inside the building died.

Between thirty and forty people were taken to the hospital with moderate injuries, while fire-fighters contained the fire that resulted from the crash. Immediately after the crash, the nearby Milan central railway station, metro station and the Linate airport were closed.

Investigation
Italian officials conducted an investigation after the crash. The cause of the crash was never exactly determined or confirmed, but the most plausible reason is an accident or a suicide. The pilot had been the victim of a scam that brought him close to bankruptcy, so the possibility of a public suicide is plausible.

Aftermath
The crash aroused fears of a terrorist attack since it occurred seven months after the September 11 attacks. Because of this, stock markets around the United States and Europe fell sharply and business trading in Milan was suspended. The fears ended when investigators concluded that the crash was not an act of terrorism.

References

See also

 1945 Empire State Building Crash
 2002 Tampa airplane crash
 October 11, 2006 New York City plane crash

2002 disasters in Italy
Aviation accidents and incidents in Italy
Pirelli
Pirelli Tower plane crash
2000s in Milan
April 2002 events in Europe
High-rise fires